The National Park Service (NPS) is an agency of the United States federal government within the U.S. Department of the Interior that manages all national parks, most national monuments, and other natural, historical, and recreational properties with various title designations. The U.S. Congress created the agency on August 25, 1916, through the National Park Service Organic Act. It is headquartered in Washington, D.C., within the main headquarters of the Department of the Interior.

The NPS employs approximately 20,000 people in  individual units covering over 85 million acres in all 50 states, the District of Columbia, and U.S. territories. As of 2019, they had more than 279,000 volunteers. The agency is charged with a dual role of preserving the ecological and historical integrity of the places entrusted to its management while also making them available and accessible for public use and enjoyment.

History

Yellowstone National Park was created as the first national park in the United States. In 1872, there was no state government to manage it, so the federal government assumed direct control. National parks and national monuments in the United States were originally individually managed under the auspices of the Department of the Interior. Artist George Catlin, during an 1832 trip to the Dakotas, was perhaps the first to suggest a novel solution to this fast-approaching reality. Indian civilization, wildlife, and wilderness were all in danger, wrote Catlin, unless they could be preserved "by some great protecting policy of government...in a magnificent park.... A nation's Park, containing man and beast, in all the wild[ness] and freshness of their nature's beauty!"

The movement for an independent agency to oversee these federal lands was spearheaded by business magnate and conservationist Stephen Mather.

With the help of journalist Robert Sterling Yard, Mather ran a publicity campaign for the Department of the Interior. They wrote numerous articles that praised the scenic and historic qualities of the parks and their possibilities for educational, inspirational, and recreational benefits.

This campaign resulted in the creation of the NPS. On August 25, 1916, President Woodrow Wilson signed the National Park Service Organic Act that mandated the agency "to conserve the scenery and the natural and historic objects and wildlife therein, and to provide for the enjoyment of the same in such manner and by such means as will leave them unimpaired for the enjoyment of future generations". Mather became the first director of the newly formed NPS.

On March 3, 1933, President Herbert Hoover signed the Reorganization Act of 1933. The act gave the president the authority to transfer national monuments from one governmental department to another. Later that summer, the new president, Franklin D. Roosevelt, made use of this power after NPS Deputy Director Horace M. Albright suggested that the NPS, rather than the War Department should manage historic American Civil War sites.

President Roosevelt agreed and issued two executive orders to implement the reorganization. These two executive orders transferred to the NPS all of the War Department's historic sites as well as national monuments that the Department of Agriculture had managed and parks in and around Washington, D.C. that an independent federal office had previously operated.

The demand for parks after the end of the World War II left the parks overburdened with demands that the NPS could not meet. In 1951, Conrad Wirth became director of the NPS and began to bring park facilities up to the standards that the public was expecting.

In 1952, with the support of President Dwight D. Eisenhower, Wirth began Mission 66, a ten-year effort to upgrade and expand park facilities for the 50th anniversary of the Park Service. New parks were added to preserve unique resources and existing park facilities were upgraded and expanded.

In 1966, as the Park Service turned 50 years old, emphasis began to turn from just saving great and wonderful scenery and unique natural features to making parks accessible to the public. Director George Hartzog began the process with the creation of the National Lakeshores and then National Recreation Areas.

Resource stewardship policies

1963: The Leopold Report

A 1963 report titled "Wildlife Management in the National Parks" was prepared by a five-member advisory board on Wildlife Management, appointed by United States Secretary of the Interior Stewart Udall. This report came to be referred to in later years for its chairman and principal author, A. Starker Leopold. The Leopold Report was just fourteen pages in length, but it set forth ecosystem management recommendations that would guide parks policy until it was revisited in 2012.

The Leopold Report was the first concrete plan for managing park visitors and ecosystems under unified principles. Park management issues and controversies addressed in this report included the difficulties of managing elk populations in Yellowstone National Park and how "overprotection from natural ground fires" in California's Sequoia National Park, Kings Canyon National Park, and Yosemite National Park had begun to threaten groves of Giant Sequoia with catastrophic wildfires. The report also established an historical baseline that read, "The goal of managing the national parks and monuments should be to preserve, or where necessary to recreate, the ecologic scene as viewed by the first European visitors." This baseline would guide ecological restoration in national parks until a climate change adaptation policy, "Resist-Adapt-Direct," was established in 2021.

2012: Revisiting Leopold: Resource Stewardship in the National Parks

National Parks director Jonathan Jarvis charged the twelve-member NPS Advisory Board Science Committee to take a fresh look at the ecological issues and make recommendations for updating the original Leopold Report. The committee published their 23-page report in 2012, titled, "Revisiting Leopold: Resource Stewardship in the National Parks." The report recommended that parks leadership "manage for change while confronting uncertainty.""... New and emerging scientific disciplines — including conservation biology, global change science, and genomics — along with new technological tools like high-resolution remote sensing can provide significant information for constructing contemporary tactics for NPS stewardship. This knowledge is essential to a National Park Service that is science-informed at all organizational levels and able to respond with contemporary strategies for resource management and ultimately park stewardship."

2021: Resist-Accept-Direct (RAD): A Framework for the 21st-century Natural Resource Manager

The "Revisiting Leopold" report mentioned climate change three times and "climate refugia" once, but it did not prescribe or offer any management tactics that could help parks managers with the problems of climate change. Hence, the 2021 report specific to the need for climate adaptation: "Resist-Accept-Direct (RAD): A Framework for the 21st-century Natural Resource Manager."  This "Natural Resource Report" has ten authors. Among them are four associated with the U.S. National Park Service, three with the U.S. Fish and Wildlife Service, and two with the U.S. Geological Survey — all of which are government agencies within the U.S. Department of Interior.

The report's Executive Summary, points to "intensifying global change.""... The convention of using baseline conditions to define goals for today’s resource management is increasingly untenable, presenting practical and philosophical challenges for managers. As formerly familiar ecological conditions continue to change, bringing novelty, surprise, and uncertainty, natural resource managers require a new, shared approach to make conservation decisions.... The RAD (Resist-Accept-Direct) decision framework has emerged over the past decade as a simple tool that captures the entire decision space for responding to ecosystems facing the potential for rapid, irreversible ecological change."

Here, the iconic species of Joshua Tree National Park is a leading example.

The three RAD options are:
 Resist the trajectory of change, by working to maintain or restore ecosystem processes, function, structure, or composition based upon historical or acceptable current conditions.
 Accept the trajectory of change, by allowing ecosystem processes, function, structure, or composition to change, without intervening to alter their trajectory.
 Direct the trajectory of change, by actively shaping ecosystem processes, function, structure, or composition towards desired new conditions.

The "Resist-Accept-Direct" Framework is described in an October 2021 paper published in Frontiers in Ecology and the Environment. Twenty researchers from federal and state agencies and universities collaborated in this effort, which included short case studies of where and how this framework has already been applied. They conclude, "As more ecosystems pass beyond the point of feasible resistance, managers will actively need to decide whether to accept changes or direct changes toward desired outcomes."

National Park System

The National Park System includes all properties managed by the National Park Service, which have a wide variety of titles or designations. The system as a whole is considered to be a national treasure of the United States, and some of the more famous national parks and monuments are sometimes referred to as "crown jewels".

The largest unit is Wrangell–St. Elias National Park and Preserve, Alaska. At 13,200,000 acres (53,000 km2), it is over 16 percent of the entire system. The smallest unit in the system is Thaddeus Kosciuszko National Memorial, Pennsylvania, at 0.02 acre (80 m2).

In addition to administering its units and other properties, the NPS also provides technical and financial assistance to several affiliated areas authorized by Congress. The largest affiliated area is New Jersey Pinelands National Reserve at 1,164,025 acres (4711 km2).

While there are laws generally covering all units of the National Park System, they are subject to management policies of individual pieces of authorizing legislation or, in the case of national monuments created under the Antiquities Act, Executive Order. For example, because of provisions within their enabling legislation, Congaree National Park is almost entirely wilderness area devoid of development, yet Yosemite allows unique developments such as the Badger Pass Ski Area and the O'Shaughnessy Dam within its boundaries. Such irregularities would not be found in other parks unless specifically provided for with exceptions by the legislation that created them.

Holdings
For current specifics and a multitude of information, see the Quick Facts section of the NPS website.

Criteria
Most NPS units have been established by an act of Congress, with the president confirming the action by signing the act into law. The exception, under the Antiquities Act, allows the president to designate and protect areas as national monuments by executive order. Regardless of the method used, all parks are to be of national importance.

A potential park should meet all four of the following standards:
 It is an outstanding example of a particular type of resource.
 It possesses exceptional value or quality in illustrating or interpreting the natural or cultural themes of the nation's heritage.
 It offers superlative opportunities for recreation, for public use and enjoyment, or for scientific study.
 It retains a high degree of integrity as a true, accurate, and relatively unspoiled example of the resource.
Before creation of a new unit, Congress typically directs the NPS to conduct a special resource study of a site to determine its national significance and suitability to be part of the National Park System.

Nomenclature
The NPS uses over 20 different titles for the park units it manages, including national park and national monument.

National parks preserve nationally and globally significant scenic areas and nature reserves.
National monuments preserve a single unique cultural or natural feature. Devils Tower National Monument was the first in 1906. While the National Park Service holds the most national monuments, a monument may be managed or co-managed by a different entity such as the Bureau of Land Management or the Forest Service.

National preserves are for the protection of certain resources and operate similar to many National Parks, but allow limited resource extraction. Activities like hunting, fishing, and some mining may be allowed depending on the site. Big Cypress National Preserve and Big Thicket National Preserve were created in 1974 as the first national preserves.

National reserves are similar to national preserves, but the operational authority can be placed with a local government. New Jersey Pinelands National Reserve was the first to be established in 1978.National historic sites protect a significant cultural resource that is not a complicated site.

National historical parks are larger areas with more complex subjects. Historic sites may also be protected in other unit types.

National military parks, battlefield parks, battlefield sites, and battlefields preserve areas associated with military history. The different designations reflect the complexity of the event and the site. Many of the sites preserve important Revolutionary War battles and Civil War battlefields. Military parks are the sites of larger actions, such as Chickamauga and Chattanooga National Military Park, Vicksburg National Military Park, Gettysburg National Military Park, and Shiloh National Military Park—the original four from 1890.

Examples of battlefield parks, battlefield sites, and national battlefields include Richmond National Battlefield Park, Brices Cross Roads National Battlefield Site, and Antietam National Battlefield.

National memorials are areas that officially memorialize a person or event, though unlike a National Historical Site, may or may not be placed at a specific historical location. Several national memorials are on the National Mall, such as the Washington Monument and Lincoln Memorial.

National seashores and national lakeshores offer preservation of the national coast line, while supporting water–based recreation. Cape Hatteras National Seashore was created in 1937. Indiana Dunes National Lakeshore and Pictured Rocks National Lakeshore, created in 1966, were the first national lakeshores.

National rivers and wild and scenic riverways protect free-flowing streams over their length. The riverways may not be altered with dams, channelization, or other changes. Recreational pursuits are encouraged along the waterways. Ozark National Scenic Riverways was established in 1964.

National recreation areas originally were units surrounding reservoirs impounded by dams built by other federal agencies, the first being Lake Mead National Recreation Area. Some national recreation areas are in urban centers, such as Gateway National Recreation Area and Golden Gate National Recreation Area, which encompass significant cultural as well as natural resources.
The National Trails System preserves long-distance routes across America. The system was created in 1968 and consists of two major components: National scenic trails are long-distance trails through some of the most scenic parts of the country. They received official protection in 1968. The Appalachian Trail is the best known. National historic trails commemorate the routes of major historic events. Some of the best known are the Trail of Tears, the Mormon Trail, and the Santa Fe Trail. These trails are administered by several federal agencies.

Special designations 
Wilderness areas are part of the National Wilderness Preservation System, which consists of federally managed lands that are of a pristine condition, established by the Wilderness Act (Public Law 88-577) in 1964. The National Wilderness Preservation System originally created hundreds of wilderness zones within already protected federally administered property, consisting of over 9 million acres (36,000 km2).

Marine Protected Areas (MPAs) began with Executive Order 13158 in May 2000, when official MPAs were established for the first time. The initial listing of U.S. areas was presented in 2010, consisting of areas already set aside under other legislation. The NPS has 19 park units designated as MPAs.

Visitation
The National Park System received over 327 million recreation visits in 2019. Park visitation grew 64 percent between 1979 and 2015.

The 10 most-visited units of the National Park System handle over 30 percent of the overall visits. The top 10 percent of parks (41) handle 61.9 percent of all visits, leaving the remaining more than 380 units to accommodate 38.1 percent of visits. (Note that only 380 sites recorded visitors during 2021 due to COVID-19-related closures).

Entrance fees

Most areas of the National Park System do not charge entrance fees and are completely supported by tax dollars, although some of the most popular areas do charge entrance fees. Fees vary site to site and are charged either on a per-vehicle or per-person basis, with most passes valid for 7 days. The America the Beautiful Pass series waives the per-vehicle fee or per-person fee for the holder and up to 3 other adults (children age 15 and younger are admitted for free at most sites). Annual passes for single areas are also available for those who visit the same site often.

Overnight stays
Over 15 million visitors spent a night in one of the national park units during 2015. The largest number (3.68 million) were tent campers. The second largest group (3.38 million) stayed in one of the lodges, followed by miscellaneous stays (on boats, group sites—2.15 million). The last three groups of over-night visitors included RV campers (2.26 million), backcountry campers (2.02 million) and users of the concession-run campgrounds (1.42 million).

Budget 

In 2019, the NPS had an annual budget of $4.085 billion and an estimated $12 billion maintenance backlog. On August 4, 2020, the Great American Outdoors Act was signed into law reducing the $12 billion maintenance backlog by $9.5 billion over a 5-year period beginning in FY 2021.

The NPS budget is divided into two primary areas, discretionary and mandatory spending. Within each of these areas, there are numerous specific purposes to which Congress directs the services activities.

The NPS budget includes discretionary spending which is broken out into two portions: the direct operations of the National Parks and the special initiatives. Listed separately are the special initiatives of the service for the year specified in the legislation. During fiscal year 2010, the service was charged with five initiatives. They include: stewardship and education; professional excellence; youth programs; climate change impacts; and budget restructure and realignment.

Discretionary spending
Discretionary spending includes the Operations of the National Parks (ONPS), from which all park operations are paid. The United States Park Police funds cover the high-profile law enforcement operations at some of the large parks, including Gateway National Recreation Area, Golden Gate National Recreation Area, and the National Mall. The National Recreation and Preservation Program and the Urban Park and Recreation Fund are outreach programs to support state and local outdoor recreational activities.

The ONPS section of the budget is divided into six operational areas. These areas include:

Resource stewardship
These are funds and people directed towards the restoration, preservation, and maintenance of natural and cultural resources. The resource staff includes biologists, geologists, archeologists, preservation specialists and a variety of specialized employees to restore and preserve cultural buildings or natural features.

Visitor services
The NPS allocates funds obtained from its visitor services for use in public programs and for educational programs for the general public and school groups. Park rangers trained in providing walks, talks, and educational programs to the public frequently conduct such programs. Media specialists prepare exhibits along trails, roads and in visitor contact facilities, as well as written brochures and web-sites.

Park protection
This includes the staff responding to visitor emergencies (criminal, medical, search and rescue), and the protection of the park's natural and cultural resources from damage by those persons visiting the park. The staff includes law enforcement rangers, park police, lifeguards, criminal investigators, and communication center operators.

Facility maintenance and operations
This is the cost of maintaining the necessary infrastructure within each park that supports all the services provided. It includes the plows and heavy equipment for road clearing, repairs and construction. There are buildings, trails, roads, docks, boats, utility pipes and wires, and a variety of hidden systems that make a park accessible by the public. The staff includes equipment operators, custodians, trail crews, electricians, plumbers, engineers, architects, and other building trade specialists.

Park support
This is the staff that provides for the routine logistical needs of the parks. There are human resource specialists, contracting officers, property specialists, budget managers, accountants and information technology specialists.

External administrative costs
The NPS pays external administrative costs to outside organizations that provide the logistical support that the NPS needs to operate its facilities. These costs include rent payments to the General Services Administration for building space, postage payments to the postal machine vendor and other direct payments.

Land and Water Conservation Fund
The Land and Water Conservation Fund (LWCF) supports Land Acquisition and State Conservation Assistance (SCA) grant programs. In 2010, the LWCF began an incremental process to fully fund its programs at a total cost of $900 million. The Department of the Interior and the United States Forest Service use these funds to purchase critical lands to protect existing public lands.

The LWCF also issues grants to States and local jurisdictions to preserve and protect Civil War battlefield sites that are not part of the national park system. The SCA program distributes funds for land preservation to individual states.

Historic Preservation Fund
The National Historic Preservation Act of 1966 set the federal vision for historic preservation in the United States. To support the vision and framework laid out in this act, the Historic Preservation Fund (HPF) was established in 1977 to provide financial assistance to, originally, states, to carry out activities related to preservation. Funding is provided from Outer Continental Shelf oil and gas lease revenues, not tax dollars, and an amount is appropriated annually by Congress. Awards from the HPF are made to States, Tribes, Territories, local governments, and non-profits. Two specific programs include the Save America's Treasures and the Preserve America. The Historic Preservation Offices makes grants available to the States, territories, and tribal lands. To honor the 250th anniversary of the United States, Congress authorized the Semiquincentennial Grant in 2020 to support the preservation of State owned sites and structures listed on the National Register of Historic Places that commemorate the founding of the nation.

Economic benefits
The NPS affects economies at national, state, and local levels. According to a 2011 Michigan State University report prepared for the NPS, for each $1 invested in the NPS, the American public receives $4 in economic value. In 2011, national parks generated $30.1 billion in economic activity and 252,000 jobs nationwide. Thirteen billion of that amount went directly into communities within 60 miles of a NPS unit.

In a 2017 study, the NPS found that 331 million park visitors spent $18.2 billion in local areas around National Parks across the nation. This spending helped support 306,000 jobs. The NPS expenditures supported $297 million in economic output in Missouri alone.

Concessions 
In an effort to increase visitation and allow for a larger audience to enjoy national park land, the NPS has numerous concession contracts with private businesses to bring recreation, resorts and other compatible amenities to their parks. NPS lodging opportunities exist at places such as the Wawona Hotel in Yosemite National Park and the Fort Baker Retreat and Conference Center in Golden Gate National Recreation Area.
Adaptive reuses like those at Fort Baker, have raised some controversy from concerns about the historical integrity of these buildings, after extensive renovations and whether such alterations fall within the spirit and/or the letter of the preservation laws they are protected by.
 Delaware North Corporation at Yosemite National Park, Yellowstone National Park, South Rim Grand Canyon National Park.
 Forever Resorts at Big Bend National Park, Blue Ridge Parkway, Badlands National Park, North Rim of Grand Canyon National Park, Olympic National Park, Lake Mead National Recreation Area, Mammoth Cave National Park, Isle Royale National Park, and Rocky Mountain National Park.
 Xanterra Parks & Resorts at Bryce Canyon National Park, Crater Lake National Park, Death Valley National Park, South Rim Grand Canyon National Park, Mount Rushmore National Memorial, Painted Desert at Petrified Forest National Park, Yellowstone National Park, and Zion National Park.

Litigation with Delaware North
In 2015, Delaware North sued the NPS in the United States Court of Claims for breach of contract, alleging that the NPS had undervalued its trademarks of the names of iconic Yosemite National Park concession facilities. The NPS estimated the value of the intangible assets including the names "Ahwahnee", "Badger Pass", "Curry Village", and "Yosemite Lodge" at $3.5 million. Delaware North lost the contract, and asserted that the historic names were worth $51 million and maintained that the incoming concessioner had to be paid that amount.

The Justice Department and the NPS asserted that this was an "improper and wildly inflated" value. Rather than pay Delaware North's demanded valuation, in January 2016 the NPS instead opted to rename the famous landmarks, effective in March. The Ahwahnee Hotel is slated to become The Majestic Yosemite Hotel, Curry Village will become Half Dome Village, and the Wawona Hotel will become Big Trees Lodge. Widespread public outcry focused on Delaware North's decision to claim ownership of names within a national park. The names were restored in 2019 upon settlement of the dispute.

Bookstores
At many Park Service sites a bookstore is operated by a non-profit cooperating association. The largest example is Eastern National, which runs bookstores in 30 states with 178 stores.
 Eastern National
 Western National Park Association
Park specific:
 Crater Lake Natural History Association
 Cuyahoga Valley National Park Association
 Devils Tower Natural History Association Bookstore
 Kennesaw Mountain Historical Association
 Oregon Caves Natural History Association
 Yellowstone Forever
 Yosemite Conservancy

Offices

The national headquarters is located in the Main Interior Building, 1849 C Street NW, several blocks southwest of the White House. The central office is composed of eleven directorates: director/deputy directors; business services; workforce management; chief information officer; cultural resources; natural resource stewardship and science; office of the comptroller; park planning, facilities and lands; partnerships and visitor experience; visitor and resource protection; and the United States Park Police.

Regional offices are in Anchorage, Atlanta, Lakewood, CO (Denver), Omaha, NE, Philadelphia, San Francisco and Seattle. The headquarters building of the National Park Service Southwest Regional Office is architecturally significant and is designated a National Historic Landmark.

The NPS is an operating unit of the U.S. Department of the Interior. The NPS director is nominated by the president of the United States and confirmed by the United States Senate. The director is supported by six senior executives.

These executives manage national programs, policy, and budget from the Washington, DC, headquarters. Under the deputy director of operations are seven regional directors, who are responsible for national park management and program implementation. Together this group is called the National Leadership Council.

Staff and volunteers

Directors 

List of National Park Service directors:

Employees
By the mid-1950s, the primary employees of the service were the park rangers, who had broad responsibilities on the parks' behalf. They cleaned up trash, operated heavy equipment, fought fires, managed traffic, cleared trails and roads, provided information to visitors, managed museums, performed rescues, flew aircraft, and investigated crime.

The NPS employs many kinds of workers:
 National Park Service Ranger
 Interpreter
 Law enforcement
 Park management (Superintendent/Deputy)
 United States Park Police
 Emergency management (Emergency medical providers, search and rescue specialists)
 Lifeguards
 Dispatchers
 Maintenance (including carpenters, plumbers, masons, laborers, auto mechanics, motor vehicle operators, heavy equipment operators, electricians)
 Park planning
 Architects, engineers, and landscape architects
 Resource management (including archeologist, biologist, botanist, aquatics, soil scientist, geologist)
 History (curators, historians, preservation technicians, historic architects, archivists)
 Fire management (managers, weather specialist, firefighters, engine captains, crew superintendents, battalion chiefs)
 Public Affairs
 Administration (human resources, finance, accountants, information technology, budgeting, concessions management)

Locations are varied. Parks exist in the nation's larger cities like New York City (Federal Hall Memorial National Historic Site), Atlanta (Martin Luther King, Jr. National Historic Site), and San Diego (Cabrillo National Monument) to some of the remotest areas of the continent like Hovenweep National Monument in southeastern Utah, to Aniakchak National Monument in King Salmon, Alaska.

Volunteers-In-Parks (VIP)
The Volunteers-In-Parks program was authorized in 1969 by the Volunteers in the Parks Act of 1969. for the purpose of allowing the public to serve in the nations parks providing support and skills for their enhancement and protection.

Volunteers come from all walks of life and include professionals, artists, laborers, homemakers and students, performing varied duties. Many come from surrounding communities and some travel significant distances. In a 2005 annual report, the NPS reported that,

...137,000 VIPs contributed 5.2 million hours of service (or 2500 FTEs) valued at $91,260,000 based on the private sector value figure of $17.55 as used by AARP, Points of Light Foundation, and other large-scale volunteer programs including many federal agencies. There are 365 separate volunteer programs throughout the NPS. Since 1990, the number of volunteers has increased an average of 2% per year.
FTE stands for full-time equivalent (one work year). In 2012, the National Park Service reported that over 221,000 volunteers contributed about 6.4 million hours annually.

Additionally, other types of volunteers also conduct offsite NPS public outreach and education, such as the Trails & Rails program guides on board certain segments of long-haul Amtrak routes, who offer passengers insights to the travel area's natural resources and heritage.

Artist-In-Residence
Across the nation, there are special opportunities for artists (visual artists, photographers, sculptors, performers, writers, composers, and crafts) to live and work in a park. Twenty-nine parks currently participate in the Artist-In-Residence program.

United States Park Rangers 
Law enforcement rangers, or protection rangers, are uniformed federal law enforcement officers with broad authority to enforce federal and state laws within NPS sites. The NPS commonly refers to law enforcement operations in the agency as visitor and resource protection.

In NPS units, law enforcement rangers are the primary police agency. The NPS also employs special agents who conduct more complex criminal investigations. Rangers and agents receive extensive police training at the Federal Law Enforcement Training Center and annual in-service and regular firearms training.

United States Park Police

The United States Park Police (USPP) is the oldest uniformed federal law enforcement agency in the United States. It functions as a full service law enforcement agency with responsibilities and jurisdiction in those NPS areas primarily located in the Washington, D.C., San Francisco, and New York City areas.

In addition to performing the normal crime prevention, investigation, and apprehension functions of an urban police force, the park police are responsible for policing many of the famous monuments in the United States and share law enforcement jurisdiction in all lands administered by the service with a force of national park rangers tasked with the same law enforcement powers and responsibilities.

Youth programs 
The NPS partners with a variety of youth oriented programs. The oldest serving group is the Student Conservation Association (SCA). It was established in 1957, committed to conservation and preservation. The SCA's goal is to create the next generation of conservation leaders.

SCA volunteers work through internships, conservation jobs, and crew experiences. Volunteers conduct resource management, historic preservation, cultural resources and conservation programs to gain experience, which can lead to career development and further educational opportunities. The SCA places volunteers in more than 350 national park units and NPS offices each year.

The Corps Network, formerly known as the National Association for Service and Corps (NASCC), represents 136 Service and Conservation Corps. These groups have programs in 42 states and the District of Columbia. Corpsmembers are between the ages of 16–25. Service and Conservation Corps are direct descendants of the Civilian Conservation Corps (CCC) of the 1930s that built park facilities in the national parks and other public parks around the country. The Corps Network was established in 1985.
 The Youth Conservation Corps (ages 15–18) brings young people into a park to restore, preserve and protect a natural, cultural, or historical resources. Enrollees are paid for their work.
 Public Land Corps (ages 16–25) is a job helping to restore, protect, and rehabilitate a local national parks. The enrollees learn about environmental issues and the parks.

Special divisions

Other special NPS divisions include the Archeology Program, Historic American Buildings Survey, National Register of Historic Places, National Natural Landmarks, the Rivers, Trails and Conservation Assistance Program, the Challenge Cost Share Program, the Federal Lands to Parks, the Hydropower Relicensing Program, the Land and Water Conservation Fund, the National Trails System, the Partnership Wild and Scenic Rivers Program, and the Natural Sounds and Night Skies Division.

Centers
The NPS operates four archeology-related centers: Harpers Ferry Center in Harpers Ferry, West Virginia, the Midwest Archeological Center in Lincoln, Nebraska, the Southeast Archeological Center in Tallahassee, Florida and the Western Archeological and Conservation Center in Tucson, Arizona. The Harpers Ferry Center specializes in interpretive media development and object conservation. The other three focus to various degrees on archaeological research and museum object curation and conservation.

National Park Service training centers include the Horace Albright Training Center, Grand Canyon; Stephen Mather Training Center, Harpers Ferry, West Virginia; Historic Preservation Training Center, Frederick, Maryland and Capital Training Center, Washington, D.C.

The Submerged Resources Center is the unit responsible for inventory and evaluation of submerged resources throughout the National Park system. The SRC is based out of the Intermountain Region's headquarters in Lakewood, Colorado.

The National Center for Preservation Technology and Training, located in Natchitoches, Louisiana, conducts research and training in the fields of archeology, architecture, landscape architecture and materials conservation.

Preservation Programs

The oldest federal preservation program, the Historic American Buildings Survey/Historic American Engineering Record (HABS/HAER), produces graphic and written documentation of historically significant architectural, engineering and industrial sites and structures. Dating from 1934, the Historic American Buildings Survey (HABS) was chartered to document historic architecture—primarily houses and public buildings—of national or regional significance. Originally a New Deal employment/preservation program, after World War II, HABS employed summer teams of advanced undergraduate and graduate students to carry out the documentation, a tradition followed to this day. Many of the structures they documented no longer exist.

HABS/HAER produces measured drawings, large-format photographs and written histories of historic sites, structures and objects, that are significant to the architectural, engineering and industrial heritage of the U.S. Its 25,000 records are part of the Library of Congress. HABS/HAER is administered by the NPS Washington office and five regional offices.

Historic American Buildings Survey
In 1933, the NPS established the Historic American Buildings Survey (HABS), based on a proposal by Charles E. Peterson, Park Service landscape architect. It was founded as a make-work program for architects, draftsmen and photographers left jobless by the Great Depression. Guided by field instructions from Washington, D.C., the first recorders were tasked with documenting a representative sampling of America's architectural heritage. After 70 years, there is now an archive of historic architecture. HABS provided a database of primary source material for the then fledgling historic preservation movement.

Historic American Engineering Record
Recognizing a similar fragility in the national industrial and engineering heritage, the NPS, the Library of Congress and the American Society of Civil Engineers (ASCE) formed the HAER program in 1969, to document nationally and regionally significant engineering and industrial sites. Later, HAER was ratified by the American Society of Mechanical Engineers (ASME), the Institute of Electrical and Electronics Engineers (IEEE), the American Institute of Chemical Engineers (AIChE) and the American Institute of Mining, Metallurgical and Petroleum Engineers (AIME). HAER documentation, in the forms of measured and interpretive drawings, large-format photographs and written histories, is archivally preserved in the Prints and Photographs Division of the Library of Congress, where it is readily available to the public.

Historic American Landscapes Survey

With the growing vitality of landscape history, preservation and management, proper recognition for historic American landscape documentation must be addressed. In response to this need, the American Society of Landscape Architects Historic Preservation Professional Interest Group worked with the National Park Service to establish a national program. Hence, in October 2000 the National Park Service permanently established the Historic American Landscapes Survey (HALS) program for the systematic documentation of historic American landscapes.

Rivers, Trails and Conservation Assistance Program
The NPS Rivers, Trails and Conservation Assistance program is designed to assist local communities and the public in preservation of rivers, trails and greenways. Unlike the mainline National Park Programs, these programs take place on non-federal property at the request of the local community. One of their better known programs is Rails to Trails, where unused railroad right-of-ways are converted into public hiking and biking trails.

National Trails System
The National Trails System is a joint mission of the NPS, the Bureau of Land Management and the U.S. Forest Service. It was created in 1968 to establish a system of long-distance National Scenic and National Historic Trails, as well as to recognize existing trails in the states as National Recreation Trails. Several additional trails have been established since 1968, and in 2009 Congress established the first National Geologic Trail.

National Heritage Areas
National Heritage Areas are a unique blend of natural, cultural, historic, and scenic resources. These are not considered units of the NPS, as they are maintained by state/territorial governments or non-profit organizations (described as local coordinating entities). The National Park Service provides an advisory role and limited technical, planning and financial assistance. Designation of National Heritage Areas is done by an Act of Congress. As of 2021 there are 55 designated heritage areas, some of which cross state lines.

Initiatives

 24-hr all Taxa BioBlitz: A joint venture of the National Geographic Society and the NPS. Beginning in 2004, at Rock Creek Parkway, the National Geographic Society and the NPS began a 10-year program of hosting a major biological survey of ten selected national park units. The intent is to develop public interest in the nations natural resources, develop scientific interest in America's youth and to create citizen scientist.
 2007: Rock Creek Park, Washington D.C. 661 species
 2008: Santa Monica Mountains National Recreation Area, Los Angeles, California. 1,700 species and more pending.
 2009: Indiana Dunes National Lakeshore, near Chicago in northern Indiana. 1,716 species and still counting.
 2010: Biscayne National Park, Miami, Florida. 810 species were identified during this 24-hr event. As classification continues, more species will be added to the list.
 2011: Saguaro National Park, Tucson, Arizona. During the 24 hours, 859 different species were identified, of which more than 400 were previously unknown in the park.
 2012: Rocky Mountain National Park, in Estes Park, In August 2012 489 species were identified.
 2013: Jean Lafitte National Historical Park and Preserve, in New Orleans. May 17–18, 2013 in the park's Barataria Preserve.
 2014: Golden Gate National Recreation Area
 2015: Hawai'i Volcanoes National Park
 2016: Whiskeytown National Recreation Area, Cabrillo National Monument, Channel Islands National Park, Washington, D.C.
 2017: Virgin Islands National Park
 Biological Diversity: Biological Diversity is the vast variety of life as identified through species and genetics. This variety is decreasing as people spread across the globe, altering areas to better meet their needs.
 Climate Change: Warming of the climate system is unequivocal, as is now evident from observations of increases in global average air and ocean temperatures, widespread melting of snow and ice, and rising global sea levels. (Intergovernmental Panel on Climate Change, 2007).
 South Florida Restoration Initiative: Rescuing an Ecosystem in Peril: In partnership with the State of Florida, and the Army Corps of Engineers, the NPS is restoring the physical and biological processes of the South Florida ecosystem. Historically, this ecosystem contained some of the most diverse habitats on earth.
 Vanishing Treasures Initiative: Ruins Preservation in the American Southwest: The Vanishing Treasures Initiative began in FY 1998 to reduce threats to prehistoric and historic sites and structures in 44 parks of the Intermountain Region. In 2002, the program expanded to include three parks in the Pacific West Region. The goal is to reduce backlogged work and to bring sites and structures up to a condition where routine maintenance activities can preserve them.
 Wetlands: Wetlands includes marshes, swamps, and bogs. These areas and the plants and animals adapted to these conditions spread from the arctic to the equator. The shrinking wetlands provide habitat for fish and wildlife, help clean water and reduce the impact of storms and floods on the surrounding communities.
 Wildland Fire: Fires have been a natural part of park eco-systems. Many plants and some animals require a cycle of fire or flooding to be successful and productive. With the advent of human intervention and public access to parks, there are safety concerns for the visiting public.

Green Park Plan
In September 2010, the NPS released its Climate Change Response Strategy, followed in April 2012 by the Green Parks Plan.

Climate Friendly Parks Program
The Climate Friendly Parks Program is a subset of the Green Parks Plan. It was created in collaboration between the NPS and the U.S. Environmental Protection Agency. The program is meant to measure and reduce greenhouse gases to help slow the effects of climate change.

Parks in the CFP program create and implement plans to reduce greenhouse gases through reducing energy and water use. Facilities are designed and retrofitted using sustainable materials. Alternative transportation systems are developed to reduce dependency on fossil fuels. Parks in the program offer public education programs about how the parks are already affected.

The CFP program provides climate-friendly solutions to the visiting public, like using clean energy, reducing waste, and making smart transportation choices. The CFP program can provide technical assistance, tools and resources for the parks and their neighboring communities to protect the natural and cultural resources.

The large, isolated parks typically generate their own electricity and heat and must do so without spoiling the values that the visitors have come to experience. Pollution is emitted by the vehicles used to transport visitors around the often-vast expanses of the parks. Many parks have converted vehicles to electric hybrids, and substitute diesel/electric hybrid buses for private automobiles. In 2001 it was estimated that replacement with electric vehicles would eliminate 25 TPY emissions entirely.

In 2010, the NPS estimated that reducing bottled water could eliminate 6,000 tons of carbon emissions and 8 million kilowatt-hours of electricity every year. The NPS Concessions office voiced concerns about concessions impacts.

By 2014, 23 parks had banned disposable water bottles.
In 2015, the International Bottled Water Association stated the NPS was "leaving sugary drinks as a primary alternative", even though the Park Service provides water stations to refill bottles, "encouraging visitors to hydrate for free". The Water Association made the national parks one of its top lobbying targets. In July 2015 Rep. Keith Rothfus added a "last-minute" amendment into Congress's appropriations bill, blocking the NPS from funding or enforcing the program. The NPS discontinued its ban on disposable water bottles in August 2017.

Related acts

 Alaska National Interest Lands Conservation Act of 1980
 Antiquities Act or Lacy Act of 1906
 Consolidated Natural Resources Act of 2008
 Endangered Species Act of 1973
 Endangered Species Act Amendments of 1978
 Fish and Wildlife Coordination Act of 1934
 Great American Outdoors Act of 2020
 Historic Sites Act of 1935
 Lacey Act of 1900 (Wildlife preservation)
 Marine Mammal Protection Act of 1972
 National Environmental Policy Act of 1970 (NEPA)
 National Historic Preservation Act of 1966 (NHPA)
 National Park Service General Authorities Act of 1970
 National Park Service Organic Act of 1916
 National Wild and Scenic River of 1968
 Redwood Act of 1978, creating one protection standard for the System
 Resource Conservation and Recovery Act of 1976
 Wilderness Act of 1964

See also

People

Individuals
 Ansel Franklin Hall, first Chief Naturalist and first Chief Forester of the NPS
 William Kent (U.S. Congressman), donated early parklands to the government
 John F. Lacey, congressman from Iowa
 Harry Yount, progenitor of the modern national park ranger

Roles
 National Park People
 National Park Ranger

Related organizations
 National Park Foundation
 National Parks Conservation Association (NPCA)

Other links
 Alt National Park Service
 Land and Water Conservation Fund
 National Park Passport Stamps
 National Park Service Rustic, style of architecture
 National Park Service uniforms
 National Park Travelers Club
 National Park to Park Highway
US Parks Police
 United States Senate Committee on Forest Reservations and the Protection of Game
 Wilderness preservation systems in the United States
List of World Heritage Sites in the United States

References

Sources

 Albright, Horace M. (as told to Robert Cahn). The Birth of the National Park Service. Salt Lake City: Howe Brothers, 1985.
 Albright, Horace M, and Marian Albright Schenck. Creating the National Park Service: The Missing Years. Norman: University of Oklahoma Press, 1999.
 Dilsaver, Lary M., ed. America's National Park System: The Critical Documents. Lanham, MD: Rowman & Littlefield, 1994.
 Everhardt, William C. The National Park Service. New York: Praeger, 1972.
 Foresta, Ronald A. America's National Parks and Their Keepers. Washington: Resources for the Future, 1985.
 Freemuth, John. Islands Under Siege: National Parks and the Politics of External Threats. Lawrence: University of Kansas Press, 1991.
 Garrison, Lemuel A;. The Making of a Ranger. Salt Lake City: Howe Brothers, 1983.
 Gartner, Bob; Exploring Careers in the National Parks. New York: The Rosen Publishing Group, Inc. 1993
 Hartzog, George B. Jr; Battling for the National Parks; Moyer Bell Limited; Mt. Kisco, New York; 1988
 Ise, John. Our National Park Policy: A Critical History. Baltimore: Johns Hopkins Press, 1961.
 Lee, Ronald F.; Family Tree of the National Park System; Eastern National Parks, Philadelphia, Pennsylvania, 1972
 Lowery, William. Repairing Paradise: The Restoration of Nature in America's National Parks. Washington: Brookings, 2009
 Mackintosh, Barry. The National Parks: Shaping the System. Washington: National Park Service, 1991.
 National Parks for the 21st Century; The Vail Agenda; The National Park Foundation, 1991
 National Park Service Almanac, Edited and Compiled by Ben Moffett and Vickie Carson: Rocky Mountain Region, National Park Service, 1991, revised 2006
 The National Parks: Shaping The System; National Park Service, Washington D.C. 1991.
 Rettie, Dwight F.; Our National Park System; University of Illinois Press; Urbana, Illinois; 1995
 Ridenour, James M. The National Parks Compromised: Pork Barrel Politics and America's Treasures. Merrillville, IN: ICS Books, 1994.
 Rothman, Hal K. Preserving Different Pasts: The American National Monuments. Urbana: University of Illinois Press, 1989.
 Runte, Alfred. National Parks, the American Experience, Lincoln, Nebraska: University of Nebraska Press, 1987.
 Sellars, Richard West. Preserving Nature in the National Parks: A History. New Haven: Yale University Press, 1997.
 Shankland, Robert; Steve Mather of the National Parks; Alfred A. Knopf, New York; 1970
 Sontag, William H. National Park Service: The First 75 Years. Philadelphia: Eastern National Park & Monument Assn., 1991.
 Sutter, Paul. 2002. Driven Wild: How the Fight against Automobiles Launched the Modern Wilderness Movement. Seattle: University of Washington press. .
 Swain, Donald. Wilderness Defender: Horace M. Albright and Conservation. Chicago: University of Chicago Press, 1970.
 Udall, Stewart L., The Quiet Crisis. New York: Holt, Rinehart & Winston, 1963.
 Wirth, Conrad L. Parks, Politics, and the People. Norman, Oklahoma: University of Oklahoma Press, 1980.

Other sources
 Gallery of all US National Parks (does not include National Park System units of any other designation)
 Gallery of National Park "Welcome" Signs
 National Park Service Meeting Notices and Rule Changes from The Federal Register RSS Feed
 Records of the National Park Service, including an administrative history and a list of regional offices of the National Park Service up to 1988
 National Park Foundation, the Congressionally chartered national charitable partner of America's National Parks

External links

 NPS official website
 Photos of Park Rangers over the last 100+ years
 National Park Service in the Federal Register
 NPS Research Links/Reference Desk
 NPS Library Information Center
 NPS Focus Digital Library & Research Station
 NPS Historic Photograph Collection
 NPS B-Roll Video (public domain)
 NPS Digital Image Archives (public domain)
 NPS Civil War Soldiers and Sailors System (CWSS)
 Community Assistance Available from the National Park Service
 Criteria for inclusion in the National Park System
 Designation of National Park System Units (national monument vs national park, etc.)
 National Park System Timeline
 The National Parks: America's Best Idea from the National Park Service Archeology Program
 National Park Service Records available in the Archival Research Catalog of the National Archives and Records Administration
 National Park Service Records available at the National Archives and Records Administration's Atlanta facility
 NPS Climate Friendly Parks

 
Nature conservation in the United States
Environmental agencies in the United States
Government agencies established in 1916
Land management in the United States
Organizations based in Washington, D.C.
United States public land law
Park police departments of the United States
1916 establishments in the United States
National park administrators